Datuk Mohmed Misbun bin Mohd Sidek  (born 17 February 1960) is a former Malaysian badminton player. He is the eldest of the famous five Sidek brothers. He is currently the Malaysia national junior badminton team director.

Early life
Misbun received his early education in local primary schools which were located in his hometown of Banting and later furthered his studies at Victoria Institution, Kuala Lumpur.

Mohd Sidek, his father, had a vision to see his children become badminton aces by training his eldest son, Misbun from an early age. By the age of seven in 1967, Misbun had begun to be seriously trained by his father at the badminton court in front of their house in Kampung Kanchong Darat, Banting, Selangor.

The same routine was later passed on to his brothers, the Sidek family which consisted of his popular brothers namely himself, Razif, Jalani, Rahman and Rashid. They were once the pride of Malaysia's badminton from the early 1980s to the early 2000s.

Career 
Misbun won his first title on the international circuit at the 1981 German Open. He helped Malaysia's  national squad win the Silver medal at the SEA Games. In the team event, he beat Indonesia’s leading player and reigning All England champion Liem Swie King. For his triumphs in badminton, Misbun was named Malaysia's Sportsman of the Year, a feat he repeated two years later.

After defeating Morten Frost and Prakash Padukone on his way to the final, Misbun suffered a disappointment at the 1982 Badminton World Cup by failing to clinch the title from a 10-1 third-set lead over Liem Swie King. He also known for the infamous “S” Service, which caused a deceptively erratic shuttle movement, which confounded their opponents and officials alike. The service caused much uproar and was eventually banned by the International Badminton Federation (IBF) in 1982.

In October 1983, Misbun turned professional and signed a contract to be represented by the International Management Group (IMG), which then represented such sports stars as Björn Borg, Jimmy Connors, Jack Nicklaus, Arnold Palmer, Sebastian Coe and Alberto Salazar.

In January 1985, the Sidek family made history when they became the largest sibling group ever to represent the country abroad in the same sporting event. Misbun, Razif, Jalani, Rahman and Rashid were all selected to compete at the Hong Kong Open.

In 1986, Misbun reached the final of the All England Open for the only time in his career but he was beaten decisively there by Morten Frost.

Misbun's last full year at the top level of badminton on 1988, was rather special to him because he played on a Malaysian National Badminton team which defeated their traditional rival Indonesia for the first time in 21 years before losing the final to China.

Coaching
Misbun was on the coaching staff, as his brother Rashid Sidek played men singles, for the 1992 Malaysia team which captured the Thomas Cup after a 25-year drought. In 1996, he and his brothers established a badminton club to find new talented players, called Nusa Mahsuri. He was a coach in Nusa Mahsuri, the first professional badminton club in Malaysia from 1996 to 2002.  

He is Malaysia national team men's singles coach from 2003-2010. He has coached Malaysia's leading singles players from 1990s, including Rashid Sidek, the Hashim brothers, Roslin Hashim and Muhammad Hafiz Hashim, Wong Choong Hann, Lee Chong Wei and Wong Mew Choo. Under his coaching, Wong Mew Choo reached World No 7 in female category of BWF ranking. Roslin Hashim and Wong Choong Hann reached the World No 1 in BWF ranking. Wong Choong Hann also became silver medalist in BWF World Championships under his coaching. Meanwhile Hafiz Hashim won All-England champion and became World No 5 in BWF ranking under his coaching. Lee Chong Wei also reached the World No 1 in BWF ranking and the 2008 Olympics men's singles final and became Olympic silver medalist and won countless of BWF tournaments under his coaching.  In July 2017, Misbun was reappointed as Malaysia national team men's singles head coach. Lee Zii Jia was coached by him during Zii Jia's early career at those period.

Personal life
He was married to Datin Latifah Sidek in 1987 until her death of COVID-19 on 23 July 2021. They have six children: Misbun Syawal Misbun, 32, twins, Lia Murni and Misbun Ramdan, 30, Lia Alifah, 26, Lia Dewi Rubita, 25 and Misbun Awalauddin, 21 (ages as of July 2021). Misbun Ramdan is also a professional badminton player.

Filmography

Film

In popular culture
He is portrayed by Rosyam Nor in the 2018 biopic film on Malaysian badminton player Lee Chong Wei Lee Chong Wei: Rise of the Legend  released on March 15, 2018.

Achievements

World Championships 
Men's Doubles

World Cup 
Men's singles

Asian Championships 
Men's singles

Southeast Asian Games 
Men's singles

International tournaments 
Men's singles

Honours 
  :
 Member of the Order of the Defender of the Realm (A.M.N.) (1982)
  Herald of the Order of Loyalty to the Royal Family of Malaysia (B.S.D.) (1988)
  Commander of the Order of Meritorious Service (PJN) - Datuk (2021)
  :
 Companion Class I of the Exalted Order of Malacca (D.M.S.M.) – Datuk (2008)

See also
 Razif Sidek
 Jalani Sidek
 Rahman Sidek
 Rashid Sidek

References

1960 births
Living people
People from Selangor
Malaysian Muslims
Malaysian people of Malay descent
Malaysian male badminton players
Badminton coaches
Badminton players at the 1986 Asian Games
Southeast Asian Games medalists in badminton
Southeast Asian Games silver medalists for Malaysia
Southeast Asian Games bronze medalists for Malaysia
Members of the Order of the Defender of the Realm
Competitors at the 1981 Southeast Asian Games
Asian Games competitors for Malaysia
Commanders of the Order of Meritorious Service
Heralds of the Order of Loyalty to the Royal Family of Malaysia